Jean-Louis Borel (3 April 1819, Fanjeaux – 20 February 1884, Versailles) was a French general, aide de camp, and politician.

He graduated from Saint-Cyr. He was aide de camp to MacMahon, in Algeria and in the Crimean War.
He was chief of staff to the National Guard.
He was commander of the Army of the Loire.

References

 

1819 births
1884 deaths
People from Aude
Politicians of the French Third Republic
French Ministers of War